Fahad Tariq (born 13 January 1990) is a cricketer who played for the United Arab Emirates national cricket team. He made his Twenty20 International debut against the Netherlands on 3 February 2016.

References

External links
 

1990 births
Living people
Emirati cricketers
United Arab Emirates Twenty20 International cricketers
People from the Emirate of Sharjah
Pakistani expatriate sportspeople in the United Arab Emirates